Celtic Thunder is an Irish singing group and stage show known for its eclectic, theatrical style show. The group is backed by the Celtic Thunder Band on their concert tours, and their live shows are known for the use of dramatic set pieces (often invoking symbols of ancient Celtic mythology), visual effects, and highly choreographed staging.

Since the original group's formation in 2007, Celtic Thunder has released twelve albums as well as ten live performances on DVD, three of which were split into two releases.

History
Celtic Thunder was conceived in the mind of producer Sharon Browne (Celtic Collections) who started the group in 2007. 
Celtic Thunder debuted in August 2007 at The Helix in Dublin, Ireland. They are accompanied by the Celtic Concert Orchestra under the direction of Phil Coulter, the musical director of the group.

In December 2008, 2009 and 2011, Billboard magazine named Celtic Thunder Top World Album Artist. Their first three albums also placed in the top 10 for World Albums.

In March 2009, Celtic Thunder opened the Saint Patrick's Day Parade in New York City.

On 28 November 2010, Celtic Thunder member Paul Byrom announced his resignation from the group to begin a solo career. He left the group when the 2010 concert tour was over.

In 2011, Damian McGinty (the group's youngest member) entered and won the Oxygen reality show The Glee Project. On 21 August 2011, McGinty announced on The Glee Projects Live Viewing Party, that he would be stepping down from Celtic Thunder due to his new role on Glee.

In 2011 David Munro became the musical director.

During their 2012 tour, Colm Keegan joined the group in May after winning Auditions for a 6th member for the Mythology taping in August and the 2013 tour. After Ryan Kelly was injured in a fall June 3, Keegan was asked to start immediately for the Atlantic City 2 week residency.  Ryan recovered in time for the taping and the tour, Colm was asked to do the fall tour because Ryan was originally not going to be able to go on fall tour until October, was decided to keep Colm in the fall lineup.

On 15 October 2012, Celtic Thunder hosted a special performance at The Pentagon.

In December 2012, Celtic Thunder performed an unplugged concert at the Sullivan Hall, New York, in front of an audience of just over 300 people. The concert was in aid of the victims of Hurricane Sandy and resulted in approximately $50,000 being raised.

On 13 January 2014, after three years with Celtic Thunder, Emmet Cahill announced his decision to take a break from Celtic Thunder.

On 12 March 2014, Sharon Browne announced that George Donaldson, one of the five original Celtic Thunder principal singers since the Celtic Thunder auditions in August 2007, died of a heart attack. He was preparing for the Celtic Thunder Australian tour in May. He is survived by his wife Carrie and daughter Sarah.

On 3 April 2014, Emmet Cahill announced that he would once again be joining Celtic Thunder on the Australian tour.

On 5 April 2014, it was unofficially announced that Emmett O'Hanlon would be filling the place of Emmet Cahill after his departure following the Celtic Thunder Cruise II in November 2014.

On 24 November 2014, it was announced that Damian McGinty would be rejoining Celtic Thunder as a temporary guest artist for their 2015 Very Best of Celtic Thunder Tour.

On 16 December 2015, Colm Keegan announced that he would be taking a break from touring with Celtic Thunder for a year to record a new solo album. Emmet Cahill rejoined Celtic Thunder to replace Keegan.

On 26 April 2016, Keith Harkin announced his departure from the group to focus on his solo career. On that same day, it was announced that Michael O'Dwyer would be replacing him.

Oct 2018 Michael O'Dwyer was unable to do the fall tour do to illness and forced to rest his voice until December. 
He wasn't given the green light to sing again until the last day of the tour.

2019 Michael O'Dwyer left Celtic Thunder to complete his degree and to work on solo projects.

Members

Current members

The current members of Celtic Thunder are (in alphabetical order of family name):

Neil Byrne
Neil Byrne, (born 16 November 1977) is from County Wicklow, Ireland. After playing guitar and singing backup on the previous albums, he became a featured soloist beginning with the show and album It's Entertainment!. He and fellow Celtic Thunder member Ryan Kelly collaborated on a solo album entitled "Acoustically Irish" in 2013, inspired by the success of the duo's "Acoustic By Candlelight" shows outside of Celtic Thunder.
 Appears on:
 As guitarist:
 The Show
 Act Two
 Take Me Home
 It's Entertainment!
 Christmas
 Heritage
 As soloist:
 It's Entertainment!
 Christmas
 Heritage
 Storm
 Voyage
 Voyage II
 Mythology
 Christmas Voices
 The Very Best of Celtic Thunder
 Legacy, Vol. 1
 Legacy, Vol. 2
 Inspirational
 Celtic Thunder X

Emmet Cahill
Emmet Cahill (born 18 October 1990) is from Mullingar, County Westmeath, Ireland. He received a university degree in Music Performance from the Royal Irish Academy of Music.  Emmet auditioned for Celtic Thunder in June 2010 and was asked to join after Paul Byrom announced his resignation. After 3 years with Celtic Thunder, on 13 January 2014, via his Facebook fan page, Emmet announced his decision to leave Celtic Thunder. He then announced on 3 April 2014, that he would be coming back for the Australian tour to pay homage to George. His solo album was released in 2015 along with a US tour. He rejoined Celtic Thunder in 2015 after Colm announced his departure from the group.
 Appears on:
 Heritage (CD only)
 Voyage
 Voyage II
 Mythology
 Christmas Voices
 The Very Best of Celtic Thunder
 Inspirational
 Celtic Thunder X

Colm Keegan
Colm Keegan (born 2 August 1989) is from Dublin, Ireland.  He attended University College Dublin on a music scholarship, graduating in 2011 with an honours degree in Music and Irish. Keegan auditioned for and was selected for Celtic Thunder in May 2012 as a new vocalist, becoming a sixth member of the previously five-man group. He was selected when Ryan had an accident and had to temporarily leave the group. He was formerly a member of the Aontas Choral Ensemble, who are known for their work with Celtic Woman. Colm appeared in the Celtic Woman DVDs 'Songs From The Heart' (2010) and 'Believe' (2012). In 2016 he announced that he would take a year's departure from the group to finish university. He released a solo album in 2016 called I'll never be alone. On 26 August 2016, Colm married Laura Durrant, who was the cello player in the band, in Scotland. They both decided not to tour with Celtic Thunder in 2017. On 2 February that year Colm and Laura welcomed their first child, a boy named Oisin James Keegan. The Keegans had their second child, a daughter in November 2018. They had a third child on 2 August 2022 (Colm's birthday) another son named Arran. As of 2022 Colm has returned to Celtic Thunder. 
 Appears on:
 Mythology
 Christmas Voices
 The Very Best of Celtic Thunder
 Legacy, Vol. 1
 Legacy, Vol. 2

Ryan Kelly
Ryan Kelly (born 6 November 1978), is from The Moy, County Tyrone, Northern Ireland.  He holds two degrees from the Queen's University Belfast, having earned a Bachelor of Science in Accounting and also a Graduate Diploma in Advanced Accounting, qualifying Ryan to be a chartered accountant. In the fall of 2010, Ryan released his first solo album "In Time". His second solo CD, "Life", was released in late 2013. He and fellow Celtic Thunder member Neil Byrne also collaborated on an album entitled "Acoustically Irish" in 2013, inspired by the success of the duo's "Acoustic By Candlelight" shows outside of Celtic Thunder.
 Appears on:
 The Show
 Act Two
 Take Me Home
 It's Entertainment!
 Christmas
 Heritage
 Storm
 Voyage
 Voyage II
 Mythology
 Christmas Voices
 The Very Best of Celtic Thunder
 Legacy, Vol. 1
 Legacy, Vol. 2
 Inspirational
 Celtic Thunder X

Damian McGinty
Damian McGinty (born 9 September 1992), is from Derry, Northern Ireland. He has been the youngest "longterm" member of the band, joining in August 2007, just a couple of weeks before turning 15. McGinty won his first singing contest at the age of five. He recorded the first Celtic Thunder album when he was fourteen years old. McGinty lists Michael Buble, Dean Martin and Frank Sinatra among his inspirations. On 29 April 2011, it was announced that Damian was chosen as one of 12 contenders for The Glee Project, a reality series on the Oxygen Network. He tied for first and had a guest starring role in the third season of the Fox hit TV show Glee. He debuted on Glee season 3 episode 4 Pot o' Gold. Though originally awarded a seven-episode arc, his run-time was later extended to 18 episodes including a guest appearance in season 4's Glee Actually. In the summer of 2013, Damian joined Paul Byrom for "The Me and My Shadow" Tour. McGinty also performed as a special guest on Ethan Bortnick's "The Power of Music" PBS special and tour. On 24 November 2014, it was announced that Damian McGinty would rejoin Celtic Thunder as a guest artist for their 2015 "The Very Best of Celtic Thunder" Tour and their new show, Legacy.
 Appears on:
 The Show
 Act Two
 Take Me Home
 It's Entertainment!
 Christmas
 Heritage
 Storm
 Voyage (CD only)
 The Very Best of Celtic Thunder
 Legacy, Vol. 1
 Legacy, Vol. 2
 Inspirational
 Celtic Thunder X

Past members
The past members of Celtic Thunder are (in alphabetical order of family name):

Paul Byrom
Paul Byrom (born 11 April 1979) is from Dublin, Ireland. In addition to Celtic Thunder, he has also performed at major sporting events in Ireland and abroad, including singing at the All Ireland Finals in Dublin's Croke Park and at Heinz Field for a Pittsburgh Steelers game in the USA. He has also performed for Ireland's president, Mary McAleese, and for Emperor Akihito of Japan. Byrom has released two albums: Velvet and I'll Be Home For Christmas. Byrom resigned to pursue a solo career in the US and left the group after the 2010 Celtic Thunder tour was over. He was replaced by Emmet Cahill.  In December 2011, he released a CD, This Is The Moment. He released the DVD two years later with a PBS Special. Paul and long-time girlfriend Dominique Coulter (daughter of former CT Musical Director Phil Coulter) were married 30 August 2013, in his hometown of Blackrock, Ireland. He performed with two original Celtic Woman members Chloë Agnew and Lisa Kelly in the concert called Lisa Kelly: The Voice of Ireland. In October 2014, after living in New York for three years Paul returned to Ireland to live. He still actively tours the United States.  In 2017, Paul played the role of Gaston, in The Helix Panto, ten years on from his first performance in Celtic Thunder in the same venue.
 Appears on:
 The Show
 Act Two
 Take Me Home
 It's Entertainment!
 Christmas
 Heritage
 Storm
 The Very Best of Celtic Thunder
 Inspirational (reused song from It's Entertainment!)

George Donaldson
George Donaldson (1 February 1968 – 12 March 2014), was the oldest member of the group and was a well-known balladeer, guitarist and flautist from Glasgow, Scotland.  Donaldson was a bus builder by trade and was self-taught as a musician.  At Scotland's Celtic Park, Donaldson played to 65,000 fans at the opening match of the 2000–2001 season. He released his new solo album "The World in My Mind" in April/May 2013. Big George, as he was affectionately known, died on 12 March 2014 in his home town of Glasgow after suffering a heart attack while he was sleeping. He was survived by his wife Carolyn and daughter Sarah. In January 2015, Carolyn announced that George's secret album "The Road" would be released February 2015.
Appears on:
The Show
 Act Two
 Take Me Home
 It's Entertainment!
 Christmas
 Heritage
 Storm
 Voyage
 Voyage II
 Mythology
 Christmas Voices
 The Very Best of Celtic Thunder
 Inspirational (reused song from The Show)

Daniel Furlong
Daniel Furlong (born 3 January 1998). Daniel Furlong joined Celtic Thunder shortly after Damian McGinty's departure. He appeared as a guest artist on the Voyage tour. 
Appears on:
Voyage
 Voyage II
Inspirational (reused song from The Voyage)

Keith Harkin
 Keith Harkin (born 10 June 1986), is from Derry, Northern Ireland. He plays the guitar and piano and has written several songs featured in the Celtic Thunder shows, including the songs "Lauren and I" and "All Day Long". Keith released a solo album in Canada on 4 September 2012, and in the United States on 18 September 2012. On 13 April 2015, Keith announced that he had become engaged to Kelsey Nichols while on a trip to Bali the year before. He released his solo album, "On Mercy Street", on 11 March 2016. On 26 April 2016, Keith announced that he was taking a leave of absence from the group to further his solo career. Keith and Kelsey were married on 2 July 2016 in Keith's hometown. On 11 November 2016, he released "Nollaig," his solo Christmas album.
 Appears on:
 The Show
 Act Two
 Take Me Home
 It's Entertainment!
 Christmas
 Heritage
 Storm
 Voyage
 Voyage II
 Mythology
 Christmas Voices
 The Very Best of Celtic Thunder
 Legacy, Vol. 1
 Legacy, Vol. 2
 Inspirational

Michael O'Dwyer
Michael O'Dwyer (born 9 March 1992), was the newest member of Celtic Thunder. He joined Celtic Thunder in April 2016 when Keith Harkin announced his departure from the group. In 2019 Michael O'Dwyer left Celtic Thunder to complete his degree and to work on solo projects.
 Appears on:
 Inspirational
 Celtic Thunder X

Emmet O'Hanlon
Emmett O'Hanlon (born 9 July 1990) is considered Irish-American. O'Hanlon joined CT in April 2014 to fill the position left open upon Emmet Cahill's departure. O'Hanlon first met Celtic Thunder producer Sharon Browne in New York City, where she invited him to audition for the show. He is a natural fit with the rest of the soloists in Celtic Thunder. He took part in the USA Fall Tour November 2014. In April 2016, O'Hanlon announced he would be leaving the group to join the highly acclaimed Patrick G. and Shirley W. Ryan Opera Center, at the Lyric Opera of Chicago for the 2016–2017 season as a resident artist.
 Appears on:
 The Very Best of Celtic Thunder
 Legacy, Vol. 1
 Legacy, Vol. 2

Member timeline

Neil Byrne began in 2007 as a backup singer and guitar player before becoming a featured soloist.

Band
 Conal Early – guitars
 Seána Davey – harp, concertina
 Charlie Foley – bass
 Nicole Hudson – violin
 David Munro – piano, musical director
 Seamus Brett – keyboards, assistant musical director
 Barry Kerr – pipes, whistles, bodhran, mandolin
 Declan O'Donoghue – percussion

Creative team
 Sharon Browne – creator, producer
 Mark Jones – production director
 David Munro – musical director
 Katie Johnston Bruce – set & lighting designer
 Stuart McInnes – front-of-house audio engineer
 Craig Bruce – monitor audio engineer
 Lucus Leckie – stage manager
 Belinda Murphy – stage director
 Jean Clancy – marketing manager
 Declan Browne – online merchandise manager
 Matthew Browne – tour merchandise manager

Concerts, tours, and discography
On 17 December 2008, Celtic Thunder completed their 2008 US tour of fifty cities. They also toured the United States extensively in fall 2009. For spring 2009 they focused on touring Canada, while also playing some concerts in the northeastern US.

During their 2008 fall tour, Celtic Thunder sold over 125,000 tickets in 49 shows and placed twentieth in the Star Tour Poll.

Celtic Thunder's first studio album and first concert special DVD were released on 18 March 2008. The album was titled Celtic Thunder and the concert special was titled The Show. It was filmed at The Helix in Dublin, Ireland, on 18 August 2007.

The second studio album was released on 16 September 2008, titled Act Two. It included the rest of the songs from The Show.

The third studio album and second concert special DVD, both titled Take Me Home, were released 14 July 2009. Take Me Home was filmed at Casino Rama, Orillia (north of Toronto), while the group was on tour in 2009. It is considered a live concert DVD rather than a studio production.

The fourth studio album and third concert special DVD, both titled It's Entertainment!, were released on 9 February 2010. It was filmed alongside Storm at the Toronto International Centre Hall 5 (a.k.a. Arrow Hall), Toronto, Ontario, on 1 October 2009, and 2 October 2009.

After It's Entertainment!, Celtic Thunder fans sent many requests to Sharon Browne for a Christmas-themed album and an album containing more Irish music. Through these efforts, Christmas and Heritage came to be, postponing the release of Storm.

The fifth studio album, titled Christmas, was released on 12 October 2010, and the concert special DVD, also titled Christmas, was released on 22 November 2010. Christmas was filmed alongside Heritage at the Mid-Hudson Civic Center in Poughkeepsie, New York, on 17 September 2010.

The sixth studio album and fifth concert special DVD titled Heritage was released on 22 February 2011. Heritage was filmed alongside Christmas at the Mid-Hudson Civic Center in Poughkeepsie, New York, on 17 September 2010.

The seventh studio album and sixth DVD, titled Storm, was released on 20 September 2011 (originally recorded in 2009). Storm, unlike Celtic Thunder's other DVDs, is not just a filmed concert but has a storyline, an elaborate set establishing a location, and costumes which help to define the singers' and dancers' characters within the story. It makes use of the It's Entertainment cast which is Celtic Thunder's largest to date (25) and features singer Deirdre Shannon, a former member of Celtic Woman.

The eighth studio album and seventh concert special DVD, titled Voyage, was released on 28 February 2012. It was originally set to be filmed on 27 September 2011, but due to changes, this filming was cancelled. The search for a new venue began on 3 October 2011, and resulted in a filming date of 18 October 2011, in Kansas City, Missouri, at the Midland Theater.

The eighth concert special DVD, companion DVD to Voyage for online purchase only, is titled Voyage II and was released on 25 June 2012. The CD of the same name was released on 1 September 2012, not available in stores.

The 2012 Celtic Thunder North American tour was called the Voyage tour.

The ninth concert DVD special is called "Mythology". It was filmed in early 2013 at the Helix Theater in Dublin, Ireland. Featuring a Celtic Cross, the stage setting is one of the most ambitious. The tour began in August 2013, with stops in Canada and the United States and to finish in Australia June 2014.

The tenth DVD, entitled "Live and Unplugged" features a live more personal show at Sullivan Hall in New York. The concert was a benefit concert for the victims effected by Hurricane Sandy.

The eleventh DVD put out by Celtic Thunder was titled Home. The DVD has many fan favourites and pre-recorded CT songs in the background of the beautiful Irish scenery.

In November and December 2014 Celtic Thunder toured the Eastern United States with songs from their Christmas CD Christmas Voices. This was the first Celtic Thunder symphony tour with symphonies such as the Pittsburgh Symphony Orchestra and The Atlanta Symphony Orchestra.

Discography and videography

Studio albums

 {|class="wikitable"
!Title
!Date of release
!Media format
!Featured soloists
!Notes
!Sales
!Certifications
|-
| Celtic Thunder: The Show
| 18 March 2008
| CD & DVD
| Byrom, Donaldson, Harkin, Kelly, McGinty
|
|
 US: 231,000
|
 ARIA: 2× Platinum (DVD)
|-
| Celtic Thunder: Act Two
| 16 September 2008
| CD
| Byrom, Donaldson, Harkin, Kelly, McGinty
|
|
 US: 193,000
|
|-
| Celtic Thunder: Take Me Home
| 14 July 2009
| CD & DVD
| Byrom, Donaldson, Harkin, Kelly, McGinty
|
|
|
 ARIA: Platinum (DVD)
|-
| Celtic Thunder: It's Entertainment!
| 9 February 2010
| CD & DVD
| Byrne, Byrom, Donaldson, Harkin, Kelly, McGinty
|
|
|
 ARIA: 2× Platinum (DVD)
|-
| Celtic Thunder: Christmas
| 12 October 2010
| CD & DVD
| Byrne, Byrom, Donaldson, Harkin, Kelly, McGinty
|
|
|
 ARIA: 2× Platinum (DVD)
|-
| Celtic Thunder: Heritage
| 22 February 2011
| CD & DVD
| Byrne, Byrom, Donaldson, Harkin, Kelly, McGinty
|
|
|
 ARIA: Platinum (DVD)
|-
| Celtic Thunder: Storm
| 20 September 2011
| CD & DVD
| Byrne, Byrom, Donaldson, Harkin, Kelly, McGinty
|recorded in 2009
|
|
 ARIA: Gold (DVD)
|-
| Celtic Thunder: Voyage
| 28 February 2012
| CD & DVD
| Byrne, Cahill, Furlong, Donaldson, Harkin, Kelly,
|
|
 US: 76,000
|
 ARIA: Platinum (DVD)
|-
| Celtic Thunder: Voyage II
| 25 June 2012
| CD & DVD
| Byrne, Cahill, Furlong, Donaldson, Harkin, Kelly,
|for online purchase only, re-released 2015 as New Voyage
|
|
|-
| Celtic Thunder: Mythology
| 19 February 2013
| CD & DVD
| Byrne, Cahill, Donaldson, Harkin, Keegan, Kelly
|also available as 2 CD deluxe edition
|
|
 ARIA: Platinum (DVD)
|-
| Celtic Thunder: Christmas Voices
| 11 October 2013
| CD
| Byrne, Cahill, Donaldson, Harkin, Keegan, Kelly
|re-released 2014 as Holiday Symphony, 2015 as The Classic Christmas Album
|
|
|-
|The Very Best of Celtic Thunder
| 13 March 2015
| CD
| Byrne, Byrom, Cahill, Donaldson, Harkin, Keegan, Kelly, McGinty, O'Hanlon
|also features re-recorded tracks to include Keegan and O'Hanlon
|
|
|- 
| Celtic Thunder: Inspirational 
| 29 September 2017 
| CD 
| Byrne, Byrom, Cahill, Donaldson, Furlong, Harkin, Kelly, McGinty, O'Dwyer
| Features new tracks recorded May 2017 and a few old tracks
|
|
|-
| Celtic Thunder X
| 2 March 2018
| CD & DVD
| Byrne, Cahill, Kelly, McGinty, O’Dwyer
| A new show for 2018 to celebrate 10 Years of Celtic Thunder.
|
|
|-
|Celtic Thunder Homeland
|12 March 2021
|CD & DVD
|Byrne, Cahill, Donaldson, Harkin, Keegan, Kelly, McGinty, O'Dwyer, O'Hanlon 
|A new album and show celebrating the Irish music from the past 10 years of Celtic Thunder
|
|
|}

In 2015 Legacy re-released the whole Celtic Thunder back-catalogue, including re-releases of Celtic Thunder, Celtic Thunder: Act Two, Take Me Home, It's Entertainment!, Christmas (with new art work), Heritage, Storm, Voyage, New Voyage (originally entitled Voyage II), Mythology and The Classic Christmas Album (originally entitled Holiday Symphony). Some of the songs originally sung by Paul Byrom got re-recorded by Emmett O'Hanlon or Colm Keegan. All tracklists were revised.

Compilations

 {|class="wikitable"
!Title
!Date of release
!Media format
!Notes
|-
| Celtic Thunder: Ireland's Call
| 2010
| CD
|QVC bonus CD released along with It's Entertainment!; includes 5 tracks
|-
| Celtic Thunder: The Irish Collection
| 2011
| CD
|11-track compilation released along with Storm; includes 1 new recording
|-
| Celtic Thunder: Heartland
| 2012
| CD plus DVD
|15-track compilation
|-
| Celtic Thunder: Islands
| 2013
| CD
|12-track compilation released for Celtic Thunder Cruise 2013; includes 2 new recordings
|-
| Celtic Thunder: Home
| 2013
| DVD
|includes fan favourites from previous DVDs
|-
| Celtic Thunder: Myths & Legends
| 25 October 2013
| CD plus DVD
|Australian exclusive package; behind the scenes DVD plus 14-track CD Mythology leftovers
|-
| Celtic Thunder: My Land
| 18 April 2014
| CD plus DVD
|Australian exclusive package; documentary DVD plus 8-track CD including Mythology leftovers
|-
| George
| 2014
| CD & DVD
|16-track George Donaldson tribute album
|-
| Celtic Horizons
| 2014
| CD
|16-track compilation released for Celtic Thunder Cruise 2014
|-
| Celtic Thunder: Celtic Roots Myths & Legends
| 30 October 2015
| 3 CDs plus 3 DVDs
|amazon.com exclusive set including the complete Mythology recording session
|-
| Celtic Thunder: Emmet Cahill's Ireland
| 2017
| CD
| 13 track album featuring Emmet Cahill
|-
| Celtic Thunder: Ireland
|2020
|CD
|15 track album
|}

Live albums

 {|class="wikitable"
!Title
!Date of release
!Media format
!Featured soloists
!Notes
!Certifications
|-
| Celtic Thunder: Live & Unplugged at Sullivan Hall New York
| 2013
| CD & DVD
| Byrne, Cahill, Donaldson, Harkin, Keegan, Kelly
|filmed in December 2012
|
|-
|Celtic Thunder: Legacy, Vol. 1
| 26 February 2016
| CD, DVD, Blu-ray, Vinyl
| Byrne, Harkin, Keegan, Kelly, McGinty, O'Hanlon
|McGinty is credited as "special guest"
|
 ARIA: Gold (DVD)
|-
|Celtic Thunder: Legacy, Vol. 2
| 12 August 2016
| CD, DVD 
| Byrne, Harkin, Keegan, Kelly, McGinty, O'Hanlon
|only available through PBS pledge drive until officially released in fall 2016
|
|}

References

External links
 

Celtic music groups
Irish folk musical groups
Scottish folk music groups
Green Linnet Records artists